This is the list of rulers of the Bariba state of Kwande.

List of Rulers of the Bariba (Borgu) state of Kouande

Territory located in present-day Benin.

The king of Kouande is called "Bagana" meaning Bull.

Banga = Ruler.

See also
Benin
Bariba
Bariba (Borgu) states
Rulers of the Bariba state of Kandi
Rulers of the Bariba state of Nikki
Rulers of the Bariba state of Paraku
Lists of Incumbents

References

Benin history-related lists
Government of Benin
Lists of African rulers
Bariba people